was a Japanese painter and costume designer who won the Academy Award for Best Costume Design for his work on the jidaigeki film Gate of Hell (1953). Wada reorganized the Japan Standard Color Association into the Japan Color Research Laboratory in 1945, and served as its president.

Personal life 
Wada was born in Hyogo Prefecture, moving to Fukuoka with his family at age 13, and moved again to Tokyo at age 16 with the intention of becoming a painter.

Bibliography 
Between 1933 and 1934, Sanzo Wada published 6-volumes of color studies (Haishoku Soukan), documenting over a thousand color combinations. The books were intended to capture traditional Japanese perceptions of color, which differed from Western approaches, and included a wide range of subtle shades and hues. 

In 2011 Seigensha published A Dictionary of Color Combinations, a book based on Wada’s original 6-volume work, containing 348 color combinations. 

 A Dictionary of Color Combinations (2011) 
A Dictionary of Color Combinations - Volume II (2020)

References

External links

1883 births
1967 deaths
20th-century Japanese painters
Best Costume Design Academy Award winners
Japanese costume designers